Jan Jacobsen may refer to 
Jan Jacobsen, (1588/89–1622) was a Flemish-born privateer, & naval commander in Spanish service
Jan Jacobsen (English service) (fl. 1660s), Flemish-born privateer in English service
Jan Jacobsen (archer) (born 1963), Danish archer